William A Scott (1926–1991) was an American-born social psychologist. After serving in the US Navy in World War II, Scott did graduate study in psychology at the University of Michigan, where he did research on propaganda and attitudes. From 1955, he held an academic appointment at the University of Colorado, where he eventually became a full professor.  While there, he made contributions to research on mental health and cognitive complexity, and to value theory.   In 1974 he migrated to Australia, becoming the Foundation Professor of Behavioural Science at James Cook University in Townsville.  In 1977, he took a position as Professor of Psychology at the Australian National University in Canberra.  During this period, he did research on cognitive structure and on the adaptation of immigrants, the latter in collaboration with his wife Ruth Scott.  He was elected a Fellow of the Academy of Social Sciences in Australia in 1977.  He died in Canberra on 8 November 1991.  

A notable contribution of William Scott was the development of the Scott's pi as a measure of inter-observer agreement for nominal scale measures.  Scott's paper on pi has been recognized as a citation classic.

References

1926 births
1991 deaths
American social psychologists
American emigrants to Australia
University of Michigan alumni
University of Colorado faculty
Academic staff of James Cook University
Academic staff of the Australian National University
Fellows of the Academy of the Social Sciences in Australia